Richard Gray (born 1877) was a professional association footballer, who played as a goalkeeper in The Football League for Burton Swifts and Burton United, and in the Southern League for Bristol Rovers.

Gray started his career playing for Burton Swifts, for whom he managed to score three goals in his 93 Football League appearances, before moving to Bristol Rovers in 1899. Rovers had just turned professional, and joined the newly created Southern League, and Gray was the first choice 'keeper in his two seasons in the West Country. He played in 53 of Rovers 56 League matches during this spell. In the meantime, his former club had merged with Burton Wanderers to form Burton United, and Gray moved to the new club in 1901, going on to play 50 times for them in the Football League.

References

Bibliography

1877 births
Year of death missing
Footballers from Derby
English footballers
Association football goalkeepers
English Football League players
Southern Football League players
Burton Swifts F.C. players
Bristol Rovers F.C. players
Burton United F.C. players